Cedeño Municipality may refer to:
 Cedeño Municipality, Bolívar
 Cedeño Municipality, Monagas

Municipality name disambiguation pages